The 2007 Saitama  Gubernatorial elections were held on August 26, 2007. Incumbent Ueda Kiyoshi was re-elected for a second term, defeating Yoshikawa Haruko.

Results 

 
 
 
 
 
 

2007 elections in Japan
Gubernatorial elections in Japan
August 2007 events in Japan
Politics of Saitama Prefecture